The Man Who Made Husbands Jealous is a British television film of 1997 based on Jilly Cooper's 1993 book of the same name in the Rutshire Chronicles series, directed by Robert Knights and produced by Sarah Lawson. The title role of Lysander Hawkley is played by Stephen Billington.

With a length of 146 minutes, broadcasters usually divide the production into a serial of three episodes. It is available on DVD.

Production
The producer, Sarah Lawson, had previously worked with the director she hired for the film, Robert Knights, on the feature film The Dawning (1988). Knights had begun his directing career in the 1970s on BBC television's Play for Today and was in the middle of a distinguished career in television drama and film which had already taken in The History Man (1981), Porterhouse Blue (1987), and Double Vision (1992). His work on Porterhouse Blue and The Glittering Prizes (1976) had been nominated for BAFTA Awards.

The casting director did not look for established stars. Stephen Billington, who had the pivotal role of Lysander Hawkley, was almost unknown when he was chosen from the hundreds who auditioned to play the part. Donna King, who played one of Lysander's love interests, had originally been a dancer and had originated the part of Bombalurina in Andrew Lloyd Webber's Cats on Broadway.

The costs of the production were reported in May 1997 as £3,000,000. The publicity pictures portrayed "a smooth young opportunist surrounded by eager women of all ages".

Outline
In the opening scene, Lysander Hawkley (Stephen Billington), accompanied by a Jack Russell Terrier which goes everywhere with him, is caught making love to Martha (Donna King), the neglected wife of Elmer Winterton (Mac McDonald). He runs naked out of the house and through a garden, pursued by the jealous Winterton with a crossbow, and hides in a tree, where he is found and trapped by Rottweilers.

Hawkley is a semi-professional tennis player in his early twenties who is becoming notorious in the gossip columns for affairs with a series of married women. After his mother's funeral, his disapproving father (T. R. Bowen) refuses to give him any more money. When Hawkley then complains to his friend Ferdie (Hugh Bonneville) about the dire state of his debts, they form a plan for Hawkley to take money from neglected wives to make their husbands jealous. This is followed with solid financial success until Hawkley meets Kitty Rannaldini (Kate Byers), the wife of a world-famous conductor. He finds himself out of his depth when he becomes besotted with her.

Reception
The People commented on the production that only Jilly Cooper could get away with "a preposterous hero with a name that sounds like an RAF Transport plane". It continued 

In The Independent, David Aaronovitch noted that "Lysander is not predatory, it's just that every woman in the world wants his first service, and what can a guy do?" Aaronovitch went on to compare Hawkley with Peter Mandelson, "The Man Who Makes Politicians Jealous".

In The Daily Mirror, Richard Wallace commented "If Tim Henman thinks the pressure's on as Wimbledon approaches, he ought to try stepping into the tennis shoes of Stephen Billington."

Cast

Stephen Billington as Lysander Hawkley
Hugh Bonneville as Ferdie Fitzgerald
T. R. Bowen as David Hawkley
Donna King as Martha Winterton
Mac McDonald as Elmer Winterton 
Rhona Mitra as Flora Seymour
Philip Bowen as Guy Seymour 
Gilly Coman as Marigold Lockton
Nicholas Ball as Larry Lockton
Kim Criswell as Georgie Maguire
Ravil Isyanov as Boris Levitsky
Rosalind Plowright	as Hermione Harefield
Derek de Lint as Roberto Rannaldini
Kate Byers as Kitty Rannaldini
Sandra Reinton as Julia
Nichola Cordey as Nikki
Stephen Ullathorne as Journalist
Tim Meats as Priest
Maureen Bennett as Matron 
Kate Blackham as Waitress
Fiona Dunn as Waitress
Joanna Jeffrees as Friend at concert
Fiona Richmond as extra (uncredited)

See also
1997 in British television
Riders (1993 film)

Notes

External links

The Man Who Made Husbands Jealous (Part 1) at bfi.org.uk
The Man Who Made Husbands Jealous (Part 2) at bfi.org.uk
The Man Who Made Husbands Jealous online at dailymotion.com

1997 British television series debuts
1997 British television series endings
1990s British drama television series
British television films
ITV television dramas
1990s British television miniseries
English-language television shows
Television series by ITV Studios
Television shows produced by Anglia Television
Television shows based on British novels
Films scored by John Murphy (composer)
1990s English-language films
Films directed by Robert Knights